Run  is a 2002 Indian Tamil-language romantic action film written and directed by N. Linguswamy starring Madhavan and Meera Jasmine (in her Tamil debut). The film also features Vivek, Sunil (in the Telugu version), Atul Kulkarni, Raghuvaran and Anu Hasan in supporting roles, while Vidyasagar composed the film's music. The film released on 5 September 2002 and won positive reviews from critics, prompting the film to be partially reshot in Telugu and remade in Hindi under the same name by the cinematographer, Jeeva.

Plot
Shiva lives in Srirangam, who comes to Chennai to gain admission in a college. He stays with his sister and her husband. Shiva doesn't like his brother-in-law and never talks to him, despite several attempts made by his sister to convince both. Shiva meets Priya during a bus journey and falls for her. He again meets her on a few more occasions and proposes to her, but she warns him to stop following her despite being in love with him. Shiva learns that Priya's brother Bhaskar is a local gangster, who attacks when anyone follows Priya. Priya does not want Shiva to get beaten by Bhaskar and advises him to stop following her, but Shiva is not scared of this.

One day, Bhaskar's henchmen spot Shiva and Priya together and try to attack him, but Shiva thrashes them, ultimately giving courage for Priya to go against Bhaskar. Shiva's brother-in-law learns about Shiva's love and offers help which makes them talk to each other, much to the happiness of Shiva's sister. Bhaskar arrives to attack Shiva's family, but Shiva threatens to attack Bhaskar's family, thereby frightening him. Priya decides to elope with Shiva.

Bhaskar chases after them along with his men where the couple are tracked down, and the goons start attacking Shiva. Priya interferes and challenges Bhaskar to attack Shiva single-handedly without any help of his men. Bhaskar accepts and starts attacking Shiva, but Shiva retaliates and hits back Bhaskar, who gets severely injured. He takes a sword, but rather than killing him. Shiva spares Bhaskar, who accepts his defeat and lets Shiva and Priya unite with each other.

Cast

 Madhavan as Shiva
 Meera Jasmine as Priya
 Raghuvaran as Shiva's brother-in-law
 Atul Kulkarni as Bhaskar
 Vivek as Mohan
 Sunil as Mohan (Telugu Version)
 Anu Hasan as Shiva's sister
 Janaki Sabesh as Shiva's mother
 Rajashree as Priya's sister-in-law
 Kalairani
 S. N. Lakshmi
 Madhan Bob as Ticket examiner
 Vijayan as Bhaskar's Right hand
 Nellai Siva as Politician
 Ravi Prakash as Shiva's father
 Bonda Mani as Biriyani shop owner
 "Saathappan" Nandhakumar as Naagaraj, Mohan's Father
 Sampath Ram

Production
Madhavan signed the film in January 2002 after being impressed with Linguswamy's narration and through the project, made his first appearance in an action-orientated role. Madhavan had wanted to do an action film after being instructed by director Mani Ratnam to move away from romantic drama films and lost eight kilograms to portray Run'''s lead role. Jyothika was originally selected to play the lead role in the film, but was later released from her contract. The makers then signed on Raima Sen to portray the lead role, before deciding to change the lead actress again after the actress struggled with the Tamil dialogues. But Meera Jasmine was consequently signed on to make her first appearance in Tamil films. Atul Kulkarni was signed on to play an antagonist in the film, and marked a rare move for the actor towards regular villain roles. Raghuvaran, Anu Hasan and Vivek were also signed on to work on the film, with the latter filming a separate comedy track.

The scenes were shot at locations in Chennai, Karaikudi, and Srirangam, among other places, while the songs were shot abroad in Denmark and Switzerland. The team also filmed scenes at the M.G. R. Film City, Chennai, where action sequences were filmed. The film completed production in one schedule, with Madhavan remarking about the well organised structure of the shoot.

Release
The film's release was postponed from July 2002 to September 2002 to finish off post-production works. However, the commercial failure of Rajinikanth-starrer Baba (2002) meant that the makers were able to prepone the film to the earliest release date in September, in order to avoid other competition. The makers of the film chose to release the film on a Thursday instead of a Friday, in order to avoid a box office clash with Prabhu Solomon's Vikram-starrer, King (2002). The film opened in September 2002 to critical acclaim and also performed well at the box office. Nowrunning.com wrote, "director Linguswami has given a very enjoyable film with good music by Vidyasagar and brilliant cinematography by Jeeva", adding  "Madhavan has proved in this film that he can also do action and that too convincingly". Another critic noted "there is nothing new about the film's story but, Madhavan's new incarnation as an action hero and Linguswamy's racy screenplay has made this a thoroughly enjoyable experience".

The film went on to become amongst the highest grossing Tamil films of the year in 2002, and became actor Madhavan's most profitable film at the time of release. Vivek also won the Best Comedian Award at the Filmfare Awards 2002 for his performance in the film. The film was later dubbed and released in Telugu under the same name during April 2003, with the comedy portions re-shot with Telugu actors. The film's cinematographer, Jeeva, later remade the film in Hindi with Abhishek Bachchan, Bhumika Chawla and Vijay Raaz in the leading roles. The film completed 150 day run at some theaters.

Music

The music was composed by Vidyasagar, with lyrics written by Na. Muthukumar, Pa. Vijay, Thamarai, Yugabharathi, Arivumathi and Viveka. The soundtrack won critical acclaim and became Vidyasagar's most successful album at the time of the release.

In popular culture
A film titled Kadhal Pisase, named after the song from the film, was released in 2012. A popular scene involving Madhavan closing a subway shutter was later parodied in the spoof film Thamizh Padam (2010), while it was also referred to in Vettai'' (2012), in which the actor and director had collaborated again.

References

External links
 

2002 films
2000s romantic action films
Tamil films remade in other languages
Films shot in Tiruchirappalli
Films directed by N. Lingusamy
2000s Tamil-language films
Indian romantic action films
Films scored by Vidyasagar
Films set in Tiruchirappalli
2000s masala films
Films shot in Karaikudi
Films shot in Denmark
Films shot in Switzerland